Patrick Christie (born 1976 in Dublin) is an Irish Gaelic football manager and former player who tended to occupy the full-back position for his club Ballymun Kickhams and at senior level for the Dublin county team. He has been manager of the Longford county team since 2022.

Playing career

Club
He won an Under 21 Championship with Ballymun Kickhams.

One of the highlights of his achievements at underage level was getting the triple with Ballymun Kickhams U-21 team by winning the Dublin Championship, the North League and then overall league winners in the same season. Although he has retired from inter-county and  club football, he occasionally makes substitute appearances or starts for the Ballymun Kickhams club.

Inter-county
He made his inter-county senior debut for the Dublin against Armagh in April 1995.

He was selected in the 2002 GAA All Stars Awards team at full-back.

He won three Leinster Senior Football Championship medals, in 2002, 2005 and 2006. He collected a 2006 Leinster championship medal, despite not appearing in any of the matches.

He served as Dublin captain in 2005.

He built himself a "cult following" among Dublin supporters. Christie was expected to make his re-appearance in the Dublin full-back line during the first round of the 2007 National Football League. This changed however, when Christie retired and dedicated himself to completing his Masters at University.

Managerial career
Long after retiring as a player he joined the Tipperary backroom management team led by David Power, which won the 2020 Munster Senior Football Championship, their first in 85 years, fittingly on the centenary weekend of Bloody Sunday at Croke Park in 1920; this role saw Christie return to his roots as he is the son of a Dublin man and Tipperary women.  

He spent summers with his family in Lorrha, has managed the DCU football team and is principal of Kilcoskan National School in North Dublin.

In February 2021, he succeeded Tom McGlinchey as manager of the Tipperary under-20s.

In August 2022, he was appointed as manager of the Longford senior football team.

References

1976 births
Living people
Alumni of Dublin City University
Ballymun Kickhams Gaelic footballers
Coaches of Gaelic football teams at Irish universities
DCU Gaelic footballers
Dublin inter-county Gaelic footballers
Gaelic football backs
Heads of schools in Ireland
Irish international rules football players
Irish schoolteachers
People educated at St Aidan's C.B.S.